Throughout the history of Vietnam, many names were used in reference to Vietnam.

History

Throughout the history of Vietnam, official and unofficial names have been used in reference to the territory of Vietnam. Vietnam was called Văn Lang during the Hồng Bàng dynasty, Âu Lạc under Thục dynasty, Nam Việt during the Triệu dynasty, Vạn Xuân during the Early Lý dynasty, Đại Cồ Việt during the Đinh dynasty and Early Lê dynasty. Starting in 1054, Vietnam was called Đại Việt (Great Việt). During the Hồ dynasty, Vietnam was called Đại Ngu.

Việt Nam ( in Vietnamese) is a variation of Nam Việt (Southern Việt), a name that can be traced back to the Triệu dynasty (2nd century BC, also known as Nanyue Kingdom). The word "Việt" originated as a shortened form of Bách Việt, a word used to refer to a people who lived in what is now southern China in ancient times. The word "Việt Nam", with the syllables in the modern order, first appears in the 16th century in a poem attributed to Nguyễn Bỉnh Khiêm. "Annam", which originated as a Chinese name in the seventh century, was the common name of the country during the colonial period. Nationalist writer Phan Bội Châu revived the name "Vietnam" in the early 20th century. When rival communist and anti-communist governments were set up in 1945, both immediately adopted this as the country's official name. In English, the two syllables are usually combined into one word, "Vietnam". However, "Viet Nam" was once common usage and is still used by the United Nations and by the Vietnamese government.

Origin of Vietnam

The term "" (Yue) in Early Middle Chinese was first written using the logograph "戉" for an axe (a homophone), in oracle bone and bronze inscriptions of the late Shang dynasty ( BC), and later as "越". At that time it referred to a people or chieftain to the northwest of the Shang. In the early 8th century BC, a tribe on the middle Yangtze were called the Yangyue, a term later used for peoples further south. Between the 7th and 4th centuries BC Yue/Việt referred to the State of Yue in the lower Yangtze basin and its people.

From the 3rd century BC the term was used for the non-Chinese populations of south and southwest China and northern Vietnam, with particular states or groups called Minyue, Ouyue (Vietnamese: Âu Việt), Luoyue (Vietnamese: Lạc Việt), etc., collectively called the Baiyue (Bách Việt,). The term Baiyue/Bách Việt first appeared in the book Lüshi Chunqiu compiled around 239 BC.

According to Ye Wenxian (1990), apud Wan (2013), the ethnonym of the Yuefang in northwestern China is not associated with that of the Baiyue in southeastern China.

In 207 BC, former Qin dynasty general Zhao Tuo/Triệu Đà founded the kingdom of Nanyue/Nam Việt with its capital at Panyu (modern Guangzhou). This kingdom was "southern" in the sense that it was located south of other Baiyue kingdoms such as Minyue and Ouyue, located in modern Fujian and Zhejiang. Several later Vietnamese dynasties followed this nomenclature even after these more northern peoples were absorbed into China.

In 968, the Vietnamese leader Đinh Bộ Lĩnh established the independent kingdom of Đại Cồ Việt (大瞿越) (possibly meaning "Great Gautama's Viet", as Gautama's Chữ Hán transcription 瞿曇 is pronounced Cồ Đàm in Sino-Vietnamese); however, 瞿's homophone cồ, 𡚝 in Chữ Nôm script, means "great") over the former Jinghai state. In 1054, Emperor Lý Thánh Tông shortened the country's name to Đại Việt ("Great Viet"). However, the names Giao Chỉ and An Nam still were the widely known names that foreigners used to refer the state of Đại Việt during medieval and early modern periods,. For examples, Caugigu (Italian); Kafjih-Guh (Arabic: كوة ك); Koci (Malay); Cauchy (Portuguese); Cochinchina (English); Annam (Dutch, Portuguese, Spanish and French). In 1787, US politician Thomas Jefferson referred to Vietnam as Cochinchina for the purpose of trading for rice.

"Sấm Trạng Trình" (The Prophecies of Principal Graduate Trình), which are attributed to Vietnamese official and poet Nguyễn Bỉnh Khiêm (1491–1585), reversed the traditional order of the syllables and put the name in its modern form "Việt Nam" as in  "Vietnam's founding ancestor lays its basis" or  "Vietnam's founding ancestor builds it up". At this time, the country was divided between the Trịnh lords of Đông Kinh and the Nguyễn lords of Thừa Thiên. By combining several existing names, Nam Việt, Annam (Pacified South), Đại Việt (Great Việt), and "Nam quốc" (southern nation), the oracles' author[s] created a new name that referred to an aspirational unified state. The word "Nam" no longer implies Southern Việt, but rather that Vietnam is "the South" in contrast to China, "the North". This sentiment had already been in the poem "Nam quốc sơn hà" (1077)'s first line: 南國山河南帝居  "The Southern country's mountains and rivers the Southern Emperor inhabits". Researcher Nguyễn Phúc Giác Hải found the word 越南 "Việt Nam" on 12 steles carved in the 16th and 17th centuries, including one at Bảo Lâm Pagoda, Haiphong (1558). Lord Nguyễn Phúc Chu (1675–1725), when describing Hải Vân Pass (then called Ải Lĩnh, lit. "Mountain-Pass's Saddle-Point"), apparently used "Việt Nam" as a national name in his poem's first line , which was translated as  "This mountain's pass is the most dangerous in Vietnam". Việt Nam was used as an official national name by Emperor Gia Long in 1804–1813. The Vietnamese asked permission from the Qing dynasty to change the name of their country. Originally, Gia Long had wanted the name Nam Việt and asked for his country to be recognized as such, but the Jiaqing Emperor refused since the ancient state of the same name had ruled territory that was part of the Qing dynasty. The Jiaqing Emperor refused Gia Long's request to change his country's name to Nam Việt, and changed the name instead to Việt Nam. Gia Long's Đại Nam thực lục contains the diplomatic correspondence over the naming. In his account about the meeting with Vietnamese officials in Hue on January 17, 1832, Edmund Roberts, American embassy in Vietnam, wrote : 
 
"Trung Quốc" 中國, (literally "Middle Country" or "Central Country"), was also used as a name for Vietnam by Gia Long in 1805. Minh Mang used the name "Trung Quốc" 中國 to call Vietnam. Vietnamese Nguyen Emperor Minh Mạng sinicized ethnic minorities such as Cambodians, claimed the legacy of Confucianism and China's Han dynasty for Vietnam, and used the term Han people 漢人 to refer to the Vietnamese. Minh Mang declared that "We must hope that their barbarian habits will be subconsciously dissipated, and that they will daily become more infected by Han [Sino-Vietnamese] customs." This policies were directed at the Khmer and hill tribes. The Nguyen lord Nguyen Phuc Chu had referred to Vietnamese as "Han people" in 1712 when differentiating between Vietnamese and Chams; meanwhile, ethnic Chinese were referred to as Thanh nhân 清人 or Đường nhân 唐人.

The use of "Vietnam" was revived in modern times by nationalists including Phan Bội Châu, whose book Việt Nam vong quốc sử (History of the Loss of Vietnam) was published in 1906. Chau also founded the Việt Nam Quang Phục Hội (Vietnam Restoration League) in 1912. However, the general public continued to use Annam and the name "Vietnam" remained virtually unknown until the Yên Bái mutiny of 1930, organized by the Việt Nam Quốc Dân Đảng (Vietnamese Nationalist Party). By the early 1940s, the use of "Việt Nam" was widespread. It appeared in the name of Ho Chi Minh's Việt Nam Độc lập Đồng minh Hội (Viet Minh), founded 1941, and was even used by the governor of French Indochina in 1942. The name "Vietnam" has been official since 1945. It was adopted in June by Bảo Đại's imperial government in Huế, and in September by Ho's rival communist government in Hanoi.

Other names
1. Legendary

2b. Official since 1945
 Đế quốc Việt Nam (帝國越南, Empire of Vietnam) : 11 March – 25 August 1945.
 Việt Nam Dân chủ Cộng hòa (越南民主共和, Democratic Republic of Vietnam) : 2 September 1945 – 18 February 1947, 10 October 1954 – 2 July 1976.
 Quốc gia Việt Nam (國家越南, State of Vietnam) : 27 May 1948 – 26 October 1955.
 Việt Nam Cộng hòa (越南共和, Republic of Vietnam) : 26 October 1955 – 30 April 1975.
 Cộng hòa Xã hội chủ nghĩa Việt Nam (共和社會主義越南, Socialist Republic of Vietnam) : 2 July 1976 to now.
3. Non-official
 Việt Thường (越常, 越嘗, 越裳國, 越裳氏): Initially, the name of a people and/or nation to the south of Jiaozhi.Đại Việt sử ký toàn thư claimed that this was Vietnamese's endonym when first presenting gifts to King Cheng of Zhou
 Lĩnh Ngoại (嶺外) : lit. "Beyond the Ranges" (i.e. Nanling Mountains). Used interchangeably with Lĩnh Nam (嶺南; pinyin: Lǐngnán; lit. "South of the Ranges"). Included Guangdong, Guangxi, Hainan, Hong Kong, and Macau, as well as modern northern Vietnam.
 Giao Chỉ quận (交趾郡): Chinese name for Đại Cồ Việt & Đại Việt
 An Nam quốc (安南國): Chinese name for Đại Việt. The basis for various foreign exonyms for Vietnam.
 Nam Việt quốc (南越國) : Proposed by Nguyễn emperor Gia Long but rejected by Qing Emperor Jiaqing.
 Đại Nam đế quốc (大南帝國) (1839 – 1945) : Diplomatic name.
 Empire d'Annam : French exonoym.
 Union indochinoise (1887–1945), Fédération indochinoise (1947–1953) or Liên bang Đông Dương (東洋聯邦).
 Đại Hùng đế quốc (大雄帝國, 30 August 1917 – 11 January 1918) : Only during the Thái Nguyên uprising.
 Việt Nam dân quốc (越南民國, 1929? – 1930) : Only during the Yên Bái mutiny.

Notes

Other spellings
In English, the spellings Vietnam, Viet-Nam, Viet Nam and Việt Nam have all been used. The 1954 edition of Webster's New Collegiate Dictionary gave both the unspaced and hyphenated forms; in response to a letter from a reader, the editors indicated that the spaced form Viet Nam was also acceptable, though they stated that because Anglophones did not know the meaning of the two words making up the name Vietnam, "it is not surprising" that there was a tendency to drop the space. In 1966, the U.S. government was known to use all three renderings, with the State Department preferring the hyphenated version. By 1981, the hyphenated form was regarded as "dated", according to Scottish writer Gilbert Adair, and he titled his book about depictions of the country in film using the unhyphenated and unspaced form "Vietnam". Currently "Vietnam" is most commonly used as the official name in English, leading to the adjective Vietnamese (instead of Viet, Vietic or Viet Namese) and 3-letter code VIE in IOC and FIFA (instead of VNM). In all other languages mainly written in Latin script, the name of Vietnam is also commonly written without a space.

Both Japanese and Korean formerly referred to Vietnam by their respective Sino-Xenic pronunciations of the Chinese characters for its names, but later switched to using direct phonetic transcriptions. , "a visit to Vietnam"). Japan's Ministry of Foreign Affairs sometimes used an alternative spelling . Similarly, in the Korean language, in line with the trend towards decreasing usage of hanja, the Sino-Korean-derived name Wollam (the Korean reading of ) has been replaced by Beteunam in South Korea and Wennam in North Korea.

See also
 Tonkin, a historical exonym for north Vietnam
 Cochinchina, a historical exonym for south Vietnam
 French Indochina, a name for a grouping of three parts of Vietnam (Tonkin, Annam, & Cochinchine), Cambodia and Laos as French colonial territories, also known as Indochinese Union
 Place names of Vietnam
 Little China (ideology)

References

Books

Cites
 
 

History of Vietnam
Vietnam
Vietnam
Vietnam